Zvi Yaakov Oppenheim (1854–1926) was Chief Rabbi of Kelm, Lithuania, and one of the founders of the Telz Yeshiva.

Biography
Rabbi Oppenheim was born in 1854 in the small village of Yakubowe (now Jokūbavas, Kretinga district, Lithuania). He showed extraordinary talents from his earliest youth and at age nine could already study a page of Talmud with commentaries on his own. He was an orphan, and his relatives sent him to Trishik, where he studied with the local rabbi and teacher, Rabbi Lev Szpiro, a son of Rabbi Leibele Kovner.

From Trishik he traveled to the study group of Rabbi Yosef Rosin, who was then chief rabbi in Telz. He was already famous in Telz as a great scholar and while he was still a very young man, Rabbi Simcha Zissel Ziv chose him as the head of his modern mussar yeshiva. After several years there, he returned to Telz and taught Talmud to the students in the group in which he himself had once studied.

In 1883, Rabbi Eliezer Gordon relinquished the Kelm rabbinate and after a short period in Slabodka, became the rabbi in Telz. Through Rabbi Gordons's intercession, the twenty-nine-year-old Rabbi Oppenheim became the new Rabbi of Kelm.

Rabbi Oppenheim served as the rabbi in Kelm for forty-three years and died on Thursday, February 11 (27 of Shevat), 1926, at 72. He was succeeded as Rabbi of Kelm by his son in law, Rabbi Kalman Beineshovitz.

1854 births
1926 deaths
People from Kretinga District Municipality
People from Telshevsky Uyezd
Lithuanian Orthodox rabbis
Haredi rabbis in Europe
19th-century Lithuanian rabbis
20th-century Lithuanian rabbis